Samuel Keeley is an Irish actor from County Offaly. His first major acting break was in the role of Philip in the RTÉ's hit television series Raw. He later appeared in the films Burnt, Monsters: Dark Continent, The Siege of Jadotville, In the Heart of the Sea and The Cured. He was also part of the main cast of 68 Whiskey.

Early and personal life
Keeley was born in 1990 and raised in Tullamore in County Offaly in Ireland. In his earlier years he had an interest in establishing a music career. Whilst attending Coláiste Choilm Secondary School, his interest in acting developed and he expanded his acting skills following his failure to complete his Leaving Certificate exams.

In his early 20s, he shared his time living between Tullamore and Dublin. During the making of The Cured, he became a vegetarian. In 2016, he left Dublin to reside partly in Iceland.

Filmography

Film

Television

References

External links
 

21st-century Irish male actors
Actors from County Offaly
People from Tullamore, County Offaly
Living people
1991 births